Narula is an Indian Punjabi (Khatri) surname of (Arora) tribe. Notable people with the surname include:

Aki Narula (born 1968), Indian fashion designer
Harpinder Singh Narula (born 1953), UK-based Indian businessman
Herman Narula (born 1988), British businessman
Jaspinder Narula, Punjabi singer and Bollywood playback singer
Mukesh Narula (born 1962), Indian cricketer
Poonam Narula (born 1976), Indian actress
Prince Narula, Indian model and television personality
Rajneesh Narula (born 1963), British economist and academic

See also 
Narula Institute of Technology, private engineering college in Kolkata, West Bengal, India

References

Surnames
Punjabi-language surnames
Indian surnames
Surnames of Indian origin
Hindu surnames
Khatri clans
Khatri surnames